Naughty by Nature is an American hip hop trio from East Orange, New Jersey, consisting of Treach (Anthony Criss), Vin Rock (Vincent Brown), and DJ Kay Gee (born Keir Lamont Gist).

History

1980s
The group formed in East Orange, New Jersey, in 1986 as The New Style. The group first appeared on the music scene in 1989, releasing an album called Independent Leaders, and the album generated the minor hit "Scuffin' Those Knees". After the release of their first album, the group was mentored by fellow New Jersey native Queen Latifah, and subsequently changed their name.

1990s
Naughty by Nature's first hit was "O.P.P.", which sampled the Jackson 5's hit "ABC" and was released in 1991 on their self-titled album Naughty by Nature. All keyboards, co-production and programming were performed by David Bellochio in his Marion Recording Studio in Fairview, New Jersey. The track peaked at #6 on the Billboard Hot 100, and was named one of the top 100 rap singles of all time in 1998 by The Source magazine, and being ranked the 20th best single of the 1990s by Spin magazine. The album generated another hit with a reworking of Bob Marley's "No Woman No Cry" called "Everything's Gonna Be All Right" (the track was also called "Ghetto Bastard" on some explicit releases). That song detailed the experiences of Treach growing up in poverty, and now rising up to live a better life.  Powered by the success of that song and "O.P.P.", their self-titled album went platinum.

Fellow New Jersey native Tony D accused Naughty by Nature of stealing a sample from his album Music Makes You Move and using it on "O.P.P." The matter was settled out of court. Naughty by Nature scored a hit with the track "Uptown Anthem" from the soundtrack to the 1992 film Juice, in which Treach had a cameo appearance. Treach began to pursue an acting career after befriending Tupac Shakur on the set of Juice, and Naughty by Nature appeared in the 1993 film The Meteor Man as a street gang. After Shakur died in 1996, Treach recorded a tribute song titled "Mourn You Til I Join You".

Later, the group had multiple hits from its third and fourth albums, called 19 Naughty III and Poverty's Paradise respectively. Both albums reached the #1 spot on the R&B/Hip-Hop Charts. "Hip Hop Hooray" was a success from the album 19 Naughty III. Its video was directed by Spike Lee and featured cameos by Queen Latifah, Eazy-E, Run-D.M.C., and Da Youngstas. Poverty's Paradise won the Grammy Award in 1996 for Best Rap Album, becoming the first album to win this award. It also spawned a hit song in "Feel Me Flow" which peaked at #17 on the Billboard Hot 100.

They produced a remix of the Michael Jackson and Janet Jackson song "Scream" in 1995.

In the mid-1990s Naughty by Nature started their own music imprint, Illtown Records, and in 1995 released an album from their protégés the Rottin Razkals.

In 1999 the group released its fifth album, titled Nineteen Naughty Nine: Nature's Fury. The album was fairly successful, being certified Gold by the RIAA, and spawned the hit "Jamboree" that peaked at #10 on the Billboard Hot 100.

2000–2012
After the release of Nineteen Naughty Nine: Nature's Fury, a dispute regarding finances developed between Kay Gee and Treach. Treach blamed Kay Gee for squandering the group's finances. Due to these disagreements DJ Kay Gee decided to leave Naughty by Nature in late 2000.  He started to develop his own record label Divine Mill. In 2001 the group released a song 'Here Comes The Money' that has constantly been used as the entrance theme for Shane McMahon in WWE. The remainder of the group, Treach and Vin Rock, released an album in 2002 called IIcons. Due to Kay Gee's absence, the group used a variety of different producers including Da Beatminerz. The album, however, received a lukewarm reception from the public. In 2002, the group disbanded.
In May 2006, Kay Gee reunited with Treach and rejoined Naughty by Nature at a concert at B.B. King's nightclub. In April 2010 they released the single "Get to Know Me Better", featuring rapper Pitbull,  while the B-side of the single was called "I Gotta Lotta". Later in 2010 they released the group's first mixtape, Naughty by Nature: Tha Mixtape. In 2011 the three worked on their long-delayed seventh group album, and it finally saw release. Titled Anthem Inc., it came out December 13, 2011.  It featured brand new material as well as re-recordings of the group's past hits.

On June 11, 2011, Naughty by Nature became the first hip-hop group to perform at Fenway Park. They performed "Hip Hop Hooray" as part of the mega boyband NKOTBSB's concert.

In March 2012, following the release of a documentary on fellow New Jersey based hip hop group Sugar Hill Gang, Naughty by Nature performed in Asbury Park, NJ at the Garden State film festival.

2013–present: Breakup and reconciliation

In May 2013, frontman Treach shocked fans when he revealed that Vin Rock had been "fired" from the group, after failing to put in the same amount of energy in the group as himself and member DJ Kay Gee. At the time, Treach said he and Vinnie hadn't been on speaking terms for around two years.

In April 2015, Treach said he and Vinnie had resolved their issues, but now their relationship is strictly "business". "You got teammates, sometimes, that's on the same team, they may not feel each other. At the end of the day, you going out to win. That's what we doing", Treach said. Although Vinnie and Treach are cordial, he said another Naughty by Nature album was unlikely.

In January 2016, in celebration of their 25th anniversary, Naughty by Nature posted the video of their song "God is Us" from Anthem Inc. to their YouTube account.

On May 2, 2019, the Mixtape Tour commenced in Cincinnati, OH. Performers on this tour include Naughty by Nature, Salt-N-Pepa, Debbie Gibson, and Tiffany, with New Kids on the Block being billed as the headline performers.

Discography

Studio albums
 Independent Leaders (1989)
 Naughty by Nature (1991)
 19 Naughty III (1993)
 Poverty's Paradise (1995)
 Nineteen Naughty Nine: Nature's Fury (1999)
 IIcons (2002)
 Anthem Inc. (2011)

Awards and nominations
Grammy Awards

!
|-
|rowspan="2"| 1995
|Poverty's Paradise
|Grammy Award for Best Rap Album
|
|rowspan="4"| 
|-
|"Feel Me Flow"
|rowspan="3"| Grammy Award for Best Rap Performance by a Duo or Group
|
|-
|align=center|1993
|"Hip Hop Hooray"
|
|-
|align=center|1991
|"O.P.P."
|
|-

American Music Awards

References

External links

[ Naughty by Nature] at AllMusic

 
American hip hop groups
American hip hop record producers
Musical groups from New Jersey
Tommy Boy Records artists
Musical groups established in 1986
Grammy Award winners for rap music
Rappers from New Jersey
Arista Records artists
TVT Records artists
MCA Records artists
Warner Records artists
Bertelsmann Music Group artists
East Orange, New Jersey
Musicians from East Orange, New Jersey
American musical trios
East Coast hip hop groups
African-American musical groups
Hardcore hip hop groups